Antiguraleus kingensis is a species of sea snail, a marine gastropod mollusk in the family Mangeliidae.

Description
The length of the shell attains 5.7 mm, its diameter 2.5 mm.

This is  a very variable species It may be 16 mm. long, as in the type of Cithara cognata, 11 mm. as in  Mangilia emina, or 575 mm. as in some adult examples of mine. In shape it may be long and narrow, or short and broad. In sculpture it may have axial ribs, well marked, narrow, almost lamelliform, or round and solid, or low, or quite obsolete, especially on the body whorl. The spiral lirae may be quite valid, or revealed only by a fairly high power of the microscope. Generally the spirals are best marked when the axials are small. The colour may be a uniform brown tint, or there may be spiral colour bands of different widths, or the shell may be white.<ref>[https://archive.org/details/transactionspro331909roya  Verco, J.C. 1909. Notes on South Australian marine Mollusca with descriptions of new species. Part XII; Transactions of the Royal Society of South Australia v. 33 (1909)] (described as  Cythara kingensis)</ref>

Distribution
This marine species is endemic to Australia and occurs off South Australia, Tasmania and Victoria

References

 Petterd, W. 1879. New species of Tasmanian marine shells. Journal of Conchology 2: 102-105
 Pritchard, G.B. & Gatliff, J.H. 1899. On some new species of Victorian mollusca. Proceedings of the Royal Society of Victoria n.s. 12(1): 100-106, pl. 8 
 Pritchard & Gatliff (1906) Catalogue of the Marine Shells of Victoria. Part IX. With complete index to the whole Catalogue; Proceedings of the Royal Society of Victoria vol. 18 p. 39-92
 Hedley, Charles (1920), A revision of the Australian Turridae; Records of the Australian Museum, vol. XIII nr. 6, Sydney

External links
  Tucker, J.K. 2004 Catalog of recent and fossil turrids (Mollusca: Gastropoda). Zootaxa 682:1-1295.

 Hedley, C. 1922. A revision of the Australian Turridae. Records of the Australian Museum 13(6): 213-359, pls 42-56]
 May, W.L. 1923. An Illustrated Index of Tasmanian Shells: with 47 plates and 1052 species''. Hobart : Government Printer 100 pp.

kingensis
Gastropods described in 1922
Gastropods of Australia